Voldemaras Novickis (22 February 1956 – 31 January 2022) was a Lithuanian handball player who competed in the 1980 Summer Olympics and in the 1988 Summer Olympics.

In 1980, he won the silver medal with the Soviet team. He played all six matches and scored nine goals. Eight years later, he won the gold medal with the Soviet team. He played five matches including the final. In 1987 he won EHF Cup with Granitas Kaunas. One year later in 1988, Granitas Kaunas managed to get into the EHF Cup final one more time, however they lost by a very narrow margin. From 1993 he became head coach of Granitas Kaunas and managed until 2019 with numerous titles won.

He died from cancer in Kaunas on 31 January 2022, at the age of 65.

References

External links
 

1956 births
2022 deaths
Soviet male handball players
Lithuanian male handball players
Lithuanian people of Polish descent
Handball players at the 1980 Summer Olympics
Handball players at the 1988 Summer Olympics
Olympic handball players of the Soviet Union
Olympic gold medalists for the Soviet Union
Olympic silver medalists for the Soviet Union
Olympic medalists in handball
Medalists at the 1988 Summer Olympics
Medalists at the 1980 Summer Olympics
People from Alytus District Municipality
Deaths from cancer in Lithuania